Neolampadidae is a family of echinoderms belonging to the order Cassiduloida.

Genera:
 Aphanopora de Meijere, 1903
 †Daradaster
 †Gitolampas

References

Cassiduloida
Echinoderm families